Marcus Pløen Ingstad (18 August 1837 – 24 September 1918) was a Norwegian jurist and educator. He was a legal historian and scholar who was the author of several books on Roman law. He served as a Professor of Jurisprudence and Dean of the Faculty of Law  at the University of Oslo between 1870 and 1918.

Biography
Ingstad was born in Christiania (now Oslo), Norway. He was the son of Fredrik Emil Ingstad (1808–77) and Louise Platou (1812–43). He attended the Royal Frederick University (now University of Oslo):  cand.philos. (1856), cand.jur.  (1861)  and Uppsala University: Dr. jur. (1877).

Ingstad was a Professor of Jurisprudence at the Faculty of Law of the Royal Frederick University  (1870–1918) and also served as Dean of the Faculty of Law. He was ordained an assessor in the Supreme Court of Norway  (1880 and 1891). He was also a legal scholar and historian as well as  the author of several books on Roman law.

Personal life
He was  married to Dorothea Greve from 1839 to 1918. They were the grandparents of Norwegian explorer Helge Marcus Ingstad.

Selected works
 Forelæsninger over Den romerske arveret (1916)
 Forelæsninger over romersk familieret (1917)
Den romerske privatrets almindelige del (1924)

References

External links
Marcus Pløen Ingstad at Oslo Museum 

1837 births
1918 deaths
University of Oslo alumni
Uppsala University alumni

Scholars of Roman law
Legal historians
Law school deans
Academic staff of the Faculty of Law, University of Oslo
Members of the Norwegian Academy of Science and Letters